Grevillea pimeleoides is a species of flowering plant in the family Proteaceae and is endemic to the south-west of Western Australia. It is an erect shrub with elliptic to egg-shaped leaves with the narrower end towards the base, and clusters of yellow or orange flowers.

Description

Taxonomy
Grevillea pimeleoides  was first formally described in 1902 by William Vincent Fitzgerald in the Journal and Proceedings of the Mueller Botanic Society of Western Australia from specimens he collected in 1901 from a "rocky spot on [a] hill-side between Smith's Mill and Helena River". The specific epithet (pimeleoides) means "Pimelea-like".

Distribution and habitat
This grevillea grows in forest or woodland with a shrubby understorey and occurs in the Helena and Canning River areas in the Jarrah Forest and Swan Coastal Plain bioregions of south-western Western Australia.

Conservation status
Grevillea pimeleoides is listed as  "Priority Four" by the Government of Western Australia Department of Biodiversity, Conservation and Attractions, meaning that it is rare or near threatened.

References

pimeleoides
Eudicots of Western Australia
Proteales of Australia
Plants described in 1902
Taxa named by William Vincent Fitzgerald